Raja Ampat Regency is a regency of Southwest Papua Province of Indonesia. The regency, which was formed based on the Law 26 of 2002, was inaugurated on 12 April 2003, and consists of a number of groups of islands situated off the north-west end of West Papua; the four main islands from south to north are Misool, Salawati, Batanta, and Waigeo. At present, the regency covers a land area of 7,559.60 km2, with a total area (including 59,820.01 km2 of sea area) stated as 67,379.61 km2. It had a population of 42,508 at the 2010 Census, and 64,141 at the 2020 Census; the official estimate as at mid 2021 was 65,403. The principal town lies at Waisai on Waigeo Island.

On 25 October 2013 the People's Representative Council (DPR) began reviewing draft laws on the establishment of new regencies, including two new regencies of North Raja Ampat and South Raja Ampat within the borders of the existing Raja Ampat Regency. As at June 2022, these changes have not yet been implemented.

Geography
Raja Ampat Regency is a regency whose territory consists mostly of and the Puiau cluster is located at a position of 2° 25' north latitude 4025' latitude
south and 130° - 132° 55' east longitude. This district has an area of ±6,084.5 km2. Administratively, the boundaries of the Raja Ampat Regency are as follows:
North : Bounded by the Pacific Ocean
South: Bounded by the Seram Sea.
West : Bounded by the Seram Sea, Central Halmahera Regency, North Maluku Province
East : Bounded by West Sorong District, Sorong City, Aimas District and Seget District (of Sorong Regency) and Seram Sea

Administrative Districts

At the 2010 Census, the regency was divided into seventeen districts (kecamatan). Subsequently, seven additional districts have been created by the division of existing districts. The twenty-four districts are tabulated below with their areas and their populations at the 2010 Census and the 2020 Census, together with the official estimates as at mid 2021. They are grouped according to the proposed split into three regencies currently under consideration (since 2014) by the government. The table also includes the locations of the district administrative centres, the number of villages in each district (urban kelurahan in Waisai Town District, and rural kampung in all the other districts), the number of named islands in each district, and its postal code.

Note: (a) the Ayau Islands (including Ayau District) lie some distance to the north of Waigeo.

Misool and Kofiau Islands (comprising the first six districts listed above) are currently in the process of being split off to form a separate South Raja Ampat Regency under those same proposals approved in 2014 by the Indonesian Government. Similarly, Waigeo and its surrounding small islands (comprising the last thirteen districts listed above) are currently in the process of being split off to form a separate North Raja Ampat Regency under proposals approved in 2014 by the Indonesian Government. This will leave just five districts (those comprising the Salawati and Batanta group) in the residual Raja Ampat Regency. However, as at May 2021, these changes have not yet been implemented.

Since 2010, the new Kota Waisai district has been created from part of Waigeo Selatan District, the new Tiplol Mayalibit district has been created from part of Telunk Mayalibit District, the new Supnin district has been created from part of Waigeo Utarat District, and the new Ayau district has been created from part of Kepulauan Ayau District.

The proposed splits from the existing regency will leave the five remaining districts, mainly consisting of Salawati and Batanta Islands, in the centre of the existing regency; note that the southern half of Salawati Island does not form part of the existing regency, but instead constitutes the Salawati Selatan and Salawati Tengah Districts of Sorong Regency, the latter having the same name as Salawati Tengah District of Raja Ampat Regency. Since 2010, the new Salawati Tengah and Salawati Barat districts have been created from parts of Salawati Utara District, while the former Selat Sagawin District has been divided into two new districts - Batanta Utara and Batanta Selatan.

Transport

Air
In early May 2012, a 1,200 metres runway of Marinda Airport on Waigeo Island was officially opened by the Transportation minister and Raja Ampat official. The runway was later extended to 2,000 metres and was predicted to be finished in 2013.

References

External links
Statistics publications from Statistics Indonesia (BPS)

Regencies of Southwest Papua
2003 establishments in Indonesia